Sydney Smith Lee (September 2, 1802 – July 22, 1869), called Smith Lee in his lifetime, was an American naval officer who served as a captain in the Confederate States Navy during the American Civil War. He was the third child of Henry "Light Horse Harry" Lee and Anne Hill Carter Lee, and the older brother of Confederate general Robert E. Lee.

Early life and education
Lee was born in Camden, New Jersey, on September 2, 1802. At the age of 18 on December 30, 1820, he was appointed midshipman in the United States Navy and 8 years later promoted to lieutenant on May 17, 1828. During the Mexican–American War Lee fought in the Battle of Veracruz with his brother Robert E.; and afterwards was stationed there. He was promoted to commander on June 4. 1850 and accompanied Commodore Perry to Japan in 1853, commanding his flagship .

Career

Commander Lee served as commandant of the U.S. Naval Academy and Philadelphia Navy Yard. He resigned from the service on April 17, 1861, the day Virginia declared it had seceded, though the resignation was not accepted. After dismissal on April 22, 1861, he accepted a commission as commander in the Confederate States Navy.

When the U.S. Navy abandoned the Gosport Navy Yard in Norfolk, Virginia, Commander Lee became the commanding officer there. When Union forces regained it, he was put in charge of batteries at Drewry's Bluffs, Virginia. On May 6, 1864, he became chief of the Confederate Navy's Bureau of Orders and Detail, replacing Captain John K. Mitchell. Lee was promoted to captain, and remained at this post until the end of the war.

Lee fought for the Confederacy reluctantly. As late as 1863 he denounced South Carolina for "getting us into this snarl" of secession, complaining that Robert and his family had persuaded him to act against his love of the U.S. Navy.

Family and death
Lee's wife was Anne Marie Mason of Virginia. One of their sons was Confederate Major General Fitzhugh Lee who later became Governor of Virginia, diplomat and writer; and served as Major General of U.S. Volunteers during the Spanish–American War. At least four more of his sons served in the Confederate States Army or Navy. After the war Lee became a farmer and died at his residence at Richland in Stafford County, Virginia on July 22, 1869.

References

1802 births
1869 deaths
American military personnel of the Mexican–American War
American people of English descent
Burials at Old Christ Church Episcopal Cemetery (Alexandria, Virginia)
Confederate States Navy captains
Lee family of Virginia
Mason family
Northern-born Confederates
People from Westmoreland County, Virginia
People of Virginia in the American Civil War
United States Navy officers